Gloucester Women's Club, also known as Long Bridge Ordinary, is a historic women's club located at Gloucester Courthouse, Gloucester County, Virginia.  It was built about 1750, and is a 1 1/2-story, three bay, gable roofed frame Colonial era dwelling. A lean-to addition was built in the 19th century.  The building is believed to have been originally constructed for commercial purposes.  The property hosted the county fair after 1913, and in 1919 the building and surrounding acre of land were acquired by the Gloucester Women's Club.

It was added to the National Register of Historic Places in 1974.

References

External links

Gloucester Women's Club, U.S. Route 17 & State Route 14, Gloucester, Gloucester County, VA: 24 photos, 11 measured drawings, and 2 photo caption pages at Historic American Buildings Survey

Historic American Buildings Survey in Virginia
Women's club buildings
Clubhouses on the National Register of Historic Places in Virginia
Cultural infrastructure completed in 1750
Buildings and structures in Gloucester County, Virginia
National Register of Historic Places in Gloucester County, Virginia
Women in Virginia